Sam Thompson (born November 11, 1992) is an American professional basketball player for the Sioux Falls Skyforce of the NBA G League. He played college basketball for Ohio State.

High school career
Thompson attended Whitney Young High School in Chicago, Illinois, where he won two state championships (2008–09) and was runner-up in 2010 contributing 10 points and 8 rebounds per game during his junior campaign and 17.6 points with a .568 FG percentage and 8.7 rebounds per game as a senior.

College career
Thompson had offers from Florida, Georgetown, Kansas, and Oregon State, but he chose Ohio State. In 146 career games over four seasons for the Buckeyes, Thompson averaged 6.9 points, 2.8 rebounds and 1.1 assists in 22.9 minutes per game. As a senior, he was named Honorable Mention All-Big 10 by the media.

Professional career
After going undrafted in the 2015 NBA draft, Thompson joined the Minnesota Timberwolves for the Las Vegas Summer League. On September 15, 2015, he signed with the Charlotte Hornets. However, he was later waived by the Hornets on October 23 after appearing in five preseason games. On October 31, he was selected by the Grand Rapids Drive with the seventh overall pick in the 2015 NBA Development League Draft. On January 14, 2016, he was traded to the Delaware 87ers in exchange for Gary Talton.

On August 11, 2016, Thompson signed in Hungary with Vasas Akademia of the Nemzeti Bajnokság I/A.

Between 2017 and 2019, Thompson played two seasons for the Greensboro Swarm of the NBA G League.

For the 2019–20 season, Thompson played in Vietnam for the Saigon Heat of the ASEAN Basketball League, averaging 20.7 points and 8.5 rebounds per game.

On July 19, 2020, Thompson signed with Novipiù Casale Monferrato of the Serie A2 Basket.

On December 29, 2021, Thompson was acquired by the Sioux Falls Skyforce of the NBA G League.

On May 27, 2022, Thompson signed with the Nelson Giants for the rest of the 2022 New Zealand NBL season.

Thompson began the 2022–23 season in Lithuania with BC Gargždai-SC before re-joining the Sioux Falls Skyforce on December 30, 2022.

Personal life
Thompson is the son of Hubert Thompson and Kennise Herring. His siblings include Franklin Thompson, Victoria Thompson and Malcolm Carstafhnur.

References

External links
Ohio State Buckeyes bio

1992 births
Living people
American expatriate basketball people in Hungary
American expatriate basketball people in New Zealand
American expatriate basketball people in Vietnam
American men's basketball players
Basketball players from Chicago
Delaware 87ers players
Grand Rapids Drive players
Greensboro Swarm players
Nelson Giants players
Ohio State Buckeyes men's basketball players
Power forwards (basketball)
Saigon Heat players
Sioux Falls Skyforce players
Small forwards
Whitney M. Young Magnet High School alumni